State Route 850 (SR 850) is a north–south state highway in Gallia County, Ohio, United States. Its southern terminus is at SR 588 in the hamlet of Rodney, which is west of Gallipolis. SR 850's northern terminus is at SR 554 in Bidwell. The route has an interchange with U.S. Route 35 (US 35), but otherwise intersects with no other numbered routes.

Route description
All of SR 850 runs within Gallia County. The route is not inclusive within the National Highway System.

History
SR 850 was created in 1995 along its current routing between SR 588 and SR 554, designated in approximately the same timeframe that the US 35 freeway was completed east of Rio Grande. No significant changes have taken place to the highway's routing since its designation.

Major intersections

See also

 List of state highways in Ohio
 List of highways numbered 850

References

External links

850
Transportation in Gallia County, Ohio